The 1958 Ohio gubernatorial election was held on November 4, 1958. Democratic nominee Michael DiSalle defeated incumbent Republican C. William O'Neill in a rematch of the 1956 election with 56.92% of the vote.

Primary elections
Primary elections were held on May 6, 1958.

Democratic primary

Candidates
Michael DiSalle, former Mayor of Toledo
Anthony J. Celebrezze, Mayor of Cleveland
Albert S. Porter, Cuyahoga County Engineer
Robert N. Gorman, former Associate Justice of the Ohio Supreme Court
Jack Sensenbrenner, Mayor of Columbus
Clingan Jackson, former Ohio State Senator
Vivienne L. Suarez

Results

Republican primary

Candidates
C. William O'Neill, incumbent Governor
Charles Phelps Taft II, former Mayor of Cincinnati

Results

General election

Candidates
Michael DiSalle, Democratic
C. William O'Neill, Republican

Results

References

1958
Ohio
Gubernatorial
November 1958 events in the United States